Short Mountain is the name of 44 summits in the United States, including:

 Short Mountain (Connecticut)
 Short Mountain (West Virginia)
 Short Mountain (Virginia)